Naarda jucundalis is a species of moth in the family Noctuidae first described by Snellen.

References

Herminiinae